West End is an inner southern suburb in the City of Brisbane, Queensland, Australia.

The Aboriginal name for the area is Kurilpa, which means place of the water rat.

Geography
Geographically, West End is bounded by the median of the Brisbane River to the west and the south.

Hill End is a neighbourhood within West End in the south-west of the suburb near the Brisbane River.

West End is adjacent to the suburbs of South Brisbane and Highgate Hill. These three suburbs make up a peninsula of the Brisbane River.

History
Before the arrival of Europeans in West End, there was an important habitual Aboriginal camp in the area around the upper part of Musgrave Park where Brisbane State High School now stands. Boundary Street in West End and in Spring Hill were named as along with Vulture Street and Wellington Road, they formed the original boundary of the Town of Brisbane. Later, when Brisbane  grew out to these boundaries, police prevented the Jagera and Turrbal peoples from being within the boundaries of the British settlement at night and on Sundays. It has been questioned whether the actions of the police were legally sanctioned or not.

The entire riverbank in the West End area was covered with impenetrable rain forest. This was described as a "tangled mass of trees, vines, flowering creepers, staghorns, elkhorns, towering scrub palms, giant ferns, and hundreds of other varieties of the fern family, beautiful and rare orchids, and the wild passion flower". Along the river bank itself were sandy beaches, water lilies in thousands and dangling convolvulus.

Bush rats or fawn-footed melomys existed in large numbers in the rain forest and were hunted by driving them into nets. They were roasted and eaten by women only. They featured in various dreaming tales and tribal lore. The Aboriginal place name of Kurilpa derives from the name Kureel-pa meaning place of water rats. The name is still used for various local places, buildings and institutions in West End and South Brisbane area, e.g. West End was located in the former Electoral District of Kurilpa.

West End was named by early British settlers after the West End of London.

European settlers took advantage of the fertile soil to establish farms and orchards. There were strawberry farms where for an entry fee, visitors could eat all they wanted.  A creek ran down from the Dornoch Terrace area into a reservoir at the corner of Melbourne and Manning streets from where water was sold. After heavy rain, this creek caused local flooding in West End. There was a spring near the site of the Boundary Hotel  which was used by residents from the south side of Brisbane to collect water with long queues forming in dry periods.

A Primitive Methodist Church opened in Hill End in October 1873.

On 16 August 1875, three schools opened: West End Boys State School, West End Girls State School and West End Infants State School, with a total of 236 pupils. On 30 June 1936, the boys' and girls' schools were merged creating West End State School. The infants' school was merged into West End State School on 16 December 1994. The school was built on a  site originally set aside to be a cemetery. However, no burials were conducted there as the much larger South Brisbane Cemetery was established in Dutton Park in 1868.

In February 1879, the Brighton Road Congregational Church was completed. It was designed by architect John R. Hall and built by Mr E. Lewis from hardwood and chamferboard. It had a  vestry, an ornamental porch and bell turret. The church closed on 21 May 1972. It was on the north-west corner of Brighton Road and Sussex Street. The church building is no longer extant. Tangara retirement village operated by Blue Care opened on the site in October 1980.

In the 1880s, there was industrial development along Montague Road, including the South Brisbane Gas Works, sawmills and a steam joinery.

The farms and orchards were steadily subdivided into suburban allotments which were popular due to the proximity of West End to the city, the river breezes and improving public transport.

West End Wesleyan Methodist Church opened in Vulture Street in 1884. It was designed  by Alexander Brown Wilson. It was built from brick at a cost of £2850 and could seat 550 people. Following the amalgamation that created the Uniting Church of Australia in 1977, it became West End Uniting Church. It is listed on the Brisbane Heritage Register.

West End was one of the first suburbs of Brisbane to be serviced by a tram line, being opened in 1885. Initially the tram was horse-drawn and terminated in Boundary Street, but in 1897 the line was electrified and extended to the corner of Hardgrave Road and Hoogley Street, via Vulture Street. It was subsequently extended down Hoogley Street to the ferry terminus at the end of Hoogley Street in 1925. The tram line closed on 13 April 1969.

St Peter's Anglican Church was dedicated on 11 September 1888 by Archdeacon Nathaniel Dawes. It was designed  by H. W. Martin and could seat 175 people. The church was at 18 Mitchell Street. Its closure on 24 April 1995 was approved by Archbishop Peter Hollingworth. As September 2022, the church building was being used as a childcare centre. It is listed on the Brisbane Heritage Register.
The riverside area of West End was badly flooded during the 1893 Brisbane flood.

The West End Library opened in 1925.

The foundation stone for St Francis of Assisi Catholic Church was laid on 10 June 1923 by the Apostolic Delegate, Monsignor Bartolomeo Cattaneo. On 26 November 1923, it was opened and blessed by Archbishop James Duhig. It was quickly realised that the site would not be large enough to build a school, so, in 1926, an  site immediately across Dornoch Terrace from the church was purchased and the church building relocated to the new site (now 47-59 Dornoch Terrace). On 22 January 1928, St Francis' Catholic Primary School opened adjacent to the church by Archbishop Duhig; the school was operated by the Sisters of Mercy with 113 students on the opening day. In 1928, a convent and a presbytery were also built on the larger site. The school closed in 1974 due to the changing demographics of the area.

The former Tristram's Drink Factory at 79 Boundary Street was built in 1928 and is one of Australia's best examples of the Mission Revival Style architecture. It was converted into a market in the 1990s and remains a heritage landmark of West End.

The Dornoch Terrace Bridge was completed in 1941, replacing an older bridge across Boundary Street built in 1888. The 1941 bridge was a precursor to a new bridge across the Brisbane River to the University of Queensland, which was never built. The 2017 University of Queensland Master Plan is still calling for a bridge from West End.

Christian Outreach College opened on 16 May 1978 in Kurilpa Street, West End. It relocated to Mansfield in 1928, but is now within the suburb boundaries of  Carindale in 1982. It is now known as Citepointe Christian College.

In 1988, the Brisbane School of Distance Education was established at 405 Montague Road. It was the amalgamation of the Primary Correspondence School (opened on 24 January 1922), the Secondary Correspondence School (opened in 1958) and the Preschool Correspondence (opened in 1974). It relocated to Coorparoo in 2011.

Scenes for the feature film Jucy (2010) were shot at the now-defunct video store Trash Video in the suburb.

The suburb was affected by the 2010–2011 Queensland floods as the Brisbane River broke its banks. From 11 January low-lying areas of the suburb and other places in Brisbane were evacuated.

Just over half (52.4%) of households were family households, 34.6% were single person households and 13.1% were group households. The median age of the West End population was 35 years, 2 years below the Australian median. Children aged under 15 years made up 11.5% of the population and people aged 65 years and over made up 8.8% of the population. The suburb has traditionally been home to Brisbane's largest Greek community, with an estimated 75% of Brisbane's Greek population living in West End by 1980. The most common ancestries in West End are English 20.6%, Australian 16.8%, Irish 10.1%, Scottish 8.0% and Greek 5.2%. Indigenous Australians make up 1.5% of the population of West End. For this reason, West End has often been cited as one of Brisbane's most successful multicultural areas. 56.6% of people living in West End were born in Australia, compared to the national average of 69.8%. The other top responses for country of birth were England 4.5%, New Zealand 3.4%, Vietnam 2.7%, Greece 2.7% and India 1.4%. 66.4% of people spoke only English at home; the next most popular languages were Greek 5.9%, Vietnamese 3.3%, Mandarin 2.0%, Cantonese 1.4% and Spanish 1.1%. The most common religious affiliation was "No Religion" (35.3%); the next most common responses were Catholic 16.5%, Anglican 8.1%, Eastern Orthodox 7.4% and Buddhism 5.2%.

Heritage listings

West End has a number of heritage-listed sites, including:
 19 Bank Street: Astrea
 178 Boundary Road: Kurilpa Library
 Dornoch Terrace: Dornoch Terrace Bridge
 15 Gray Road: Wanda Walha
 30 Sussex Street: Brighton Terrace
 37 Gray Road: Nassagaweya
 277 Montague Road: Gas Stripping Tower
 321 Montague Road: West End Gasworks
 406 Montague Road: Thomas Dixon Centre
24 Vulture Street: West End State School

Planning and development

In 2005, just over 50% of the dwellings are standalone houses and 37% are higher density residential properties, including multi-storey blocks of apartments and units. Some houses are covered by historic preservation laws seeking to preserve the historical character e.g. tin roofing.  Contrasting sharply with the historic homes are new buildings of contemporary designs. Prices for all types of properties have been increasing dramatically in recent decades. According to REIQ, the median unit/town-house price in West End for 2005 was $310,000, and the median house price is $490,500.

In May 2012, it was announced that the South Brisbane Riverside Neighbourhood Plan would be resubmitted to allow the construction of 12-storey buildings, considerably higher than the previous seven-storey limit. According to the Brisbane City Council's Neighbourhood Planning chairwoman, Amanda Cooper, there are six sites located between Montague Road and the Brisbane River, south of Davies Park, which are at least one-hectare in area, a requirement for construction of the increased building heights.

The nature of some developments has led to community disquiet. The redevelopment of the Absoe site is a high-profile example.

As at January 2023, the median price for the preceding year was $1,682,500 for a house and $587,500 for an apartment. The median weekly rental for the same period was $740 for a house and $520 for an apartment.

Economy
 

The area's major attraction is its café and restaurant scene, as well as its shopping, which is centred along Boundary Street. It is also known for its high concentration of ethnic and organic grocery stores. Davies Park on the riverside hosts one of the largest farmer's markets in Greater Brisbane every Saturday called the Green Flea Markets. Weekend 'brunch' culture is prevalent in West End, with numerous cafes and restaurants serving the area.

West End has an industrial backbone, in particular, along Montague Road down to Riverside Drive. Given the value of riverside property now that flooding is better managed, factories are now being sold to make way for upscale waterfront apartments. This is part of a plan to increase population densities in near-city suburbs. It will significantly affect the ability of working-class people to remain in the area and change the economic make-up of the area. As such, West End is currently undergoing urban renewal, with a large change in real estate prices, and new development changing the area demographic.

Education 
West End State School is a government primary (Prep-6) school for boys and girls at 24 Vulture Street. In 2018, the school had an enrolment of 1021 students with 71 teachers (61 full-time equivalent) and 32 non-teaching staff (23 full-time equivalent). In 2017, plans to expand the school's site were announced following a purchase of an adjacent block of land.

There is no secondary school in West End. The nearest government secondary school is Brisbane State High School in neighbouring South Brisbane to the east. This school is known for its academic excellence and demand for places outstrips supply. However students within its local catchment area are always able to attend this school, which drives up the price of real estate in suburbs within the catchment like West End as parents seek to buy or rent within the catchment to obtain enrolment in the school.

Transport

The suburb is well serviced by buses and ferries. Bus services include Route 199 BUZ to New Farm-City-West End Ferry, leaving every five minutes during peak times, Route 192 University of Queensland to City, Route 198 Highgate Hill Hail & Ride (Coles West End-PA Hospital-Woolloongabba-Vulture St-Coles West End) and a City Glider service along Montague Road.

CityCat services leave from the West End ferry wharf in Orleigh Street. The ferry terminal was destroyed in the 2011 floods.  It was replaced and operating on 24 July 2011.

Culture

West End has a number of galleries and artist-run initiatives which showcase the works of local artists. The neighbouring suburb of South Brisbane, the designated cultural precinct of Brisbane, is home to some of Queensland's most well-regarded cultural education institutions, such as the Queensland College of Art, the Queensland Conservatorium Griffith University, Queensland Performing Arts Centre. However, as Southbank is primarily commercial, many artists and students live in the much larger and residential West End.

Amenities 

The Brisbane City Council operates a public library at 178-180 Boundary Street (currently known as West End Library but previously known as Kurilpa Library).

St Francis of Assisi Catholic Church is at 47-49 Dornoch Terrace. It is part of the Parish of Dutton Park served by the Capuchin Franciscan Friars.

West End Uniting Church is at 113 Vulture St.

Sport
Queensland Cup rugby league team, the Souths Logan Magpies, play their home games at Davies Park, West End (Bill Tyquin Oval). Prior to 2003, it was the famous Souths Magpies who competed on the Davies Park field and renowned players such as Mal Meninga, Gary Belcher, Peter Jackson, Mick Veivers, Greg Veivers, Harold 'Mick' Crocker, Frank Drake, Mitch Brennan, Bob Linder, Ash Lumby, Norm Carr, Richo Hill and Chris Phelan wore the black and white of the club. Current ARLC Chief John Grant was another ex-Souths player, representing Australia from the club, while veteran rugby league coach Wayne Bennett was a premiership-winning mentor with the Magpies in the mid-1980s. 
During the 1970s and 1980s, the Magpies were an institution in West End and their 1981 and 1985 Brisbane Rugby League grand final victories transformed the suburb into a party town.

Along the river bank of Milton Reach can be found the rowing sheds of a number of Brisbane secondary schools such as Brisbane Grammar School and Brisbane State High School, as well as rowing clubs. Amongst these is the Commercial Rowing club. It was established in 1877 and is Queensland's oldest amateur sporting club.

The South Brisbane Sailing Club has its club house near Orleigh Park. The club was established in 1903 and has been located in West End since 1956.

Open spaces
, open spaces in West End include:
 Boundary Street Park, 349 Boundary Street
 Bunyapa Park, 68 Vulture Street
 Davies Park, 349 Boundary Street
 Orleigh Park, 68 Hill End Terrace
 two Ryan Street Parks, 115 & 147 Ryan Street
 South Brisbane Riverside Lands Park 
 West End Community Park, 155 Boundary Street
 West End Riverside Lands Park, 60 Kurilpa Street
Bunyapa Park at 68 Vulture Street was formerly called West End Urban Common. Its new name suggested by Aboriginal activist Sam Watson and was officially renamed in December 2017.

See also

 Street Arts

References

External links

 West End's Community Newspaper website
 
 Street walkers guide to westend
 Zhan Teh West End, Brisbane photographs, State Library of Queensland

 
Suburbs of the City of Brisbane